is a character who debuted in Square's (now Square Enix) 1997 role-playing video game Final Fantasy VII. She was created as a foil to her teammate Aerith Gainsborough by members of the development team including director Yoshinori Kitase and writers Kazushige Nojima and Tetsuya Nomura; Nomura additionally contributed her visual design. She has since appeared as a playable fighter in Ehrgeiz and the Dissidia Final Fantasy series and made cameo appearances in several other titles, such as Kingdom Hearts II and Itadaki Street. Beginning in 2005, she has featured in sequels and spin-offs as part of the Compilation of Final Fantasy VII series, including the computer-animated film Advent Children and the Final Fantasy VII Remake project.

Tifa is the childhood friend of Cloud Strife, the protagonist of Final Fantasy VII. She is owner of the 7th Heaven bar in the slums of Midgar and a member of the eco-terrorist group AVALANCHE. She convinces Cloud Strife to join the group to keep him close and safe, and later assists him in saving the Planet from the game's villain, Sephiroth. Titles in the Compilation of Final Fantasy VII later expanded upon her character, such as in Advent Children, where she attempts to convince Cloud to let go of his self-imposed guilt and move on with his life after Sephiroth's defeat.

Named the pin-up girl of the "cyber generation" by The New York Times, Tifa has been compared to Lara Croft as an example of a strong, independent and attractive female character in video games. Media have repeatedly praised both the character's strength and appearance and described her as one of the best female characters in gaming.

Creation and development

Designed by Tetsuya Nomura, Tifa was not present in early versions of Final Fantasy VII, as initially, the game was to have only three playable characters; the protagonist Cloud Strife, Aerith Gainsborough and Barret Wallace. However, during a phone call to project director Yoshinori Kitase, it was suggested that at some point in the game, one of the main characters should die and after much discussion as to whether it should be Barret or Aerith, the producers chose Aerith. Nomura later joked that this was his idea, so as to enable him to introduce Tifa into the game. The notion of having two concurrent heroines and having the hero waver between them was something Kitase liked, describing it as something new in the Final Fantasy series. Nomura describes Tifa's character in Advent Children as having several dimensions, calling her "like a mother, a sweetheart and a close ally in battle" and "remarkably strong, not only emotionally, but physically as well".

Tifa was designed to use the "monk" character class that appears in previous games in the series. She has long, black hair in a style resembling a dolphin's tail at the tip and simple and monotone garments, consisting of a white crop top and black miniskirt. She also wears red boots and gloves, with black sleeves extending from wrist to elbow; her skirt is held up by a pair of narrow black suspenders and a large metal guard covers her left elbow. She stands about 5 feet 6 inches (167 cm) tall and has measurements of 36-24-35" (92-60-88 cm).

Initially, Nomura had difficulty deciding whether to go with a miniskirt or long pants. Seeking input, he passed his sketches around Square's offices and the majority of the staff members approved of the miniskirt design. This additionally served as a contrast to Aerith, whose "long skirt" was her trademark. The attire was explained as giving her freedom of movement, due to her hand-to-hand combat specialty and the skirt, referred to as "quite short [...] giving a considerable degree of exposure", was kept as a staple of her alternate costumes. The developers noted that due to her figure, her otherwise plain garments took on a pleasant appearance.

When producing Final Fantasy VII: Advent Children, co-director Takeshi Nozue had difficulty developing a framework for Tifa's body that was "balanced, yet showed off her feminine qualities". Her outfit was redesigned at this point, with emphasis on expressing those qualities, while still being pleasing to the eye. A white tank top with black zipped up vest covers her front, a pink ribbon wraps around her left biceps and boots cover her feet. A black buttoned-up skirt covers her thighs and she wears shorts beneath, with a piece of cloth similar to a coattail extending from the back of the skirt's waistband and ending at her ankles. She no longer uses suspenders to hold up her skirt and she wears her gloves only during the film's fight scenes. Her hairstyle was changed to end at the middle of her back, with the removal of the dolphin tail from her original design. This alteration was because of the difficulty of animating her original length of hair, as well as problems that arose due to its black color and lighting.

For Final Fantasy VII Remake, Square modified Tifa's original appearance to make her look more realistic as members from the staff realized her design would not fit fight scenes. As a result, she was given black undergarments and a tank top, giving her a sporty feel. The development team wanted to avoid the appearance of favoring either Tifa or Aerith so they deliberately tried to match their screen time. Both Tifa and Aerith were positioned as heroes in Remake.

Casting
Nomura noted that he liked Ayumi Ito as an actress and wished to work with her on Advent Children. With Aerith's voice actor already decided, Nomura asked Ito to voice Tifa, feeling her "husky voice" would offer a good contrast to Maaya Sakamoto's soft-spoken Aerith. Although Tifa's updated design had already been finalized, Ito's casting motivated them to blend many traits from the voice actress into the character's appearance. Cloud's voice actor Takahiro Sakurai said that while he recorded most of his work individually, he performed alongside Ito for a few scenes. These recordings left him feeling "deflated", as the "exchanges he has with Tifa [could] be pretty painful". Ayaka Mitsumoto voiced Tifa in the flashback from the remake where a teenage Tifa interacts with Cloud. Finding a voice suitable for the young Tifa made Nomura and the staff worried in the recording of the title.

English voice actress Rachael Leigh Cook has stated in an interview for Kingdom Hearts II that she enjoys playing Tifa and described her as "very strong physical and emotionally, but also very sensitive" and "very multi-dimensional". In voicing the character, Cook listened to Ito's recording as a guide to how the character sounds. Following Advent Children, Cook thanked Nomura for the film he created as she enjoyed it. Britt Baron voiced Tifa in Final Fantasy VII Remake. As a child, Tifa was voiced by Glory Curda.

Appearances

Final Fantasy VII
Introduced in Final Fantasy VII, Tifa is the childhood friend of Cloud Strife and owner of the 7th Heaven bar in the slums of Midgar, a technologically advanced metropolis owned by the Shinra Electric Power Company. She is also a member of the eco-terrorist organization AVALANCHE, who oppose Shinra's extraction and use of Mako, the planet's spiritual energy, as a power source. She convinces Cloud to join the group to keep a closer eye on him after noticing his personality has changed, and she follows him in pursuit of the game's antagonist, Sephiroth. Unable to keep him from being manipulated by Sephiroth, she helps him recover after his mind becomes fractured and they realize their mutual feelings for one another, working together to defeat Sephiroth.

In a formative memory of their time as children, Tifa and Cloud had decided to follow a path to a mountain near their hometown of Nibelheim. However, they were both injured and Tifa was in a coma for a week, with her father holding Cloud responsible for the incident. Cloud eventually left to join Shinra's SOLDIER program in order to become stronger, but it is later revealed that he did it primarily to attract her attention. In response, she requested if she were ever in danger, he would return to save her. Years later, during Sephiroth's rampage in Nibelheim, Cloud rescued Tifa after she was wounded by Sephiroth. Tifa was taken to safety by her martial arts instructor and eventually arrived in Midgar, meeting AVALANCHE's leader, Barret Wallace. She joined AVALANCHE to get revenge for the destruction of her home. Shortly before the beginning of Final Fantasy VII, she encountered an incoherent Cloud at the city's train station and convinced him to work for Barret, to keep him close and watch over him.

In early drafts of Final Fantasy VII, Tifa was a background character. Her role in AVALANCHE was to add support behind the scenes and to cheer everyone up after missions, as well as having a particular fondness for Cloud. She was supposed to have a large scar on her back caused by Cloud, and partial amnesia from the incident when she had received it. A scene intended to imply herself and Cloud having sex was proposed by Masato Kato, one of the event planners, but it was replaced with a toned-down version by Kitase in which a risqué line is followed by a fade to black. In an interview, Nojima stated that none of the staff thought the scene would become such an issue at the time.

Compilation of Final Fantasy VII

In 2005, she appeared in the CGI film Final Fantasy VII: Advent Children, set two years after the events of the game. She tries to give emotional support to Cloud, urging him to come to terms with the unwarranted guilt he places upon himself. She also takes care of Barret's adopted daughter Marlene and an orphan, Denzel. During the film, she duels against one of the antagonists, Loz, and later she battles the summoned creature Bahamut SIN with the team. Script writer Kazushige Nojima described her role in the film as "very much like any woman who's been left behind by a man", stating that while they did not want her to appear clingy, they wanted to portray that she was emotionally hurt by Cloud's departure. In the film's initial draft, she was intended to have a more central role in the then-short film, which only featured herself, Cloud and several children, with the story revolving around a note being delivered to him.

Tifa features in the prequel games Before Crisis and Crisis Core, as well as the OVA Last Order. Each of these appearances show different perspectives on the destruction of Nibelheim. The novella "Case of Tifa", written as part of the On the Way to a Smile series, is a story set between the original game and Advent Children. Told from her point of view, the story details how she creates a new 7th Heaven bar in the city of Edge and attempts to hold onto the concept of a normal family with herself and Cloud, despite him beginning to isolate himself from others. Tifa also appears briefly in the game Dirge of Cerberus: Final Fantasy VII, set one year after the events of Advent Children in which she helps the protagonist Vincent Valentine defend the planet against the monster Omega WEAPON; in the game's epilogue, she discuss Vincent's disappearance.

Tifa features prominently as a playable character in Final Fantasy VII Remake, which covers only the Midgar portion of the original game. By focusing solely on Midgar, the development team was able to include additional scenes that developed the relationship between Tifa and Aerith.

Other appearances
Outside of the Compilation of Final Fantasy VII, Tifa features in the fighting game Ehrgeiz as an unlockable character and an optional boss. She is a playable character in the electronic board games Itadaki Street Special and Itadaki Street Portable. In Kingdom Hearts II, she appears in her Advent Children attire, searching for Cloud and later fighting various Heartless, the series' monsters. She was originally planned to appear in the Final Mix version of the original Kingdom Hearts, but due to time constraints the staff members chose to incorporate Sephiroth instead. Whereas in the game Cloud goes missing after a battle with Sephiroth, in the manga adaptation, Tifa successfully finds him in Hollow Bastion. In 2015, she was added to the mobile game Final Fantasy: Record Keeper as a playable character.

Tifa is one of the playable characters in the fighting game Dissidia 012 Final Fantasy, which features characters from various Final Fantasy games. She is featured in her Final Fantasy VII outfit, but the player has access to her Advent Children form and a third costume that is shown during Tifa's appearances in Nibelheim. The first print run of the game features another form based on artwork by Yoshitaka Amano. In LittleBigPlanet 2, Tifa is featured as a downloadable character model, and as a Mii costume and spirit in Super Smash Bros. Ultimate.

Korean singer Ivy portrayed the character in a 2007 music video for the song "유혹의 소나타" ("Sonata of Temptation"). Square Enix sued for plagiarism as the video recreated shot for shot a fight scene from Advent Children. Both civil and criminal courts agreed, banning the video from airing and imposing hefty fines on the director and agency.

Reception
Since her introduction, critics reacted positively to Tifa. The New York Times featured her as the pin-up girl of for the "cyber generation", while The Beaumont Enterprise cited Tifa as an example of a strong female character in video games in the wake of Lara Croft from the Tomb Raider series. IGN noted that her strength and complex narrative allowed her to transcend superficial readings of her character based on her appearance. Tifa's romantic relationship with Cloud was also praised though some sites noted there were arguments between fans about whether or not Aerith was more suitable to be Cloud's love interest. In a retrospective, Polygon analyzed several arguments fans have made about Cloud's preferred partner and how each side misrepresents the other's chosen heroine. Polygon concludes that there is no winning couple as, after killing Sephiroth, Cloud has a vision of Aerith when Tifa tries to help him and the duo agrees to meet her again.

Tifa's appearances in other media also received praise. For Advent Children, Kotaku and Destructoid believed the film's story primarily focused on the relationship between Tifa and Cloud due to the latter's guilt and inability to move on. With Remake, Comic Book Resources looked forward to her and Cloud's relationship and the differences from the original game. Kotaku praised Remake for toning down the love triangle that fans often mentioned and instead made Tifa and Aerith friendlier with each other. Destructoid enjoyed her combo-based gameplay style due to how different it is from the rest of the playable characters. Siliconera enjoyed that Remake made time to expand Tifa's characterization and role in the story. UGO also praised her inclusion in the fighting game Ehrgeiz. Rachael Leigh Cook was praised by both IGN and Anime News Network for her portrayal as Tifa in the film.

Tifa has been a popular character, often appearing near the top of fan polls. A significant part of Tifa's reception has focused on her sex appeal; Electronic Gaming Monthly awarded her the "Hottest Game Babe" of 1997, calling her "as well-proportioned as they come" and praising her as a viable alternative to Lara Croft. The IGN staff attributed her placement on their list to her breasts, though in a later 2009 article admitted that such reactions may sound sexist and overlook other aspects of the character.

See also
 List of Final Fantasy VII characters

References

External links

 Tifa Lockhart on the Final Fantasy Wiki

Characters designed by Tetsuya Nomura
Female characters in video games
Fictional bartenders
Fictional criminals in video games
Fictional eco-terrorists
Fictional fist-load fighters
Fictional female martial artists
Fictional martial artists in video games
Final Fantasy VII characters
Science fantasy video game characters
Square Enix protagonists
Video game characters introduced in 1997
Video game characters with superhuman strength